Scarborough Campus can refer to two different university campuses:

University of Hull: Scarborough Campus
University of Toronto Scarborough